William Shareshull may refer to:

William de Shareshull, English lawyer
William Shareshull (MP) for Staffordshire (UK Parliament constituency)